Henriciella algicola is a Gram-negative, aerobic and heterotrophic bacterium from the genus of Henriciella which has been isolated from seawater.

References 

Caulobacterales
Bacteria described in 2017